Oorige Upakari is a 1982 Indian Kannada-language film, directed by Joe Simon and produced by A. Radhakrishna Raju and V. L. Srinivasa Murthy. The film stars Vishnuvardhan, Padmapriya, Vajramuni and Dheerendra Gopal. The film has musical score by Chellapilla Satyam.

Cast

Vishnuvardhan
Padmapriya
Vajramuni
Dheerendra Gopal
Musuri Krishnamurthy
Chethan Ramarao
Sadashiva Brahmavar
Rajanand
Prabhakar
Rajasulochana
K. Vijaya
Uma Shivakumar
Ashakiran
Mangala Bhushan
Rathnamma
Shanthamma
Master Naveen
Dwarakish in Guest Appearance
Jyothi Lakshmi in Guest Appearance

Soundtrack
The music was composed by Satyam.

References

External links
 

1982 films
1980s Kannada-language films
Films scored by Satyam (composer)